Punctillum is a genus of fungi in the class Dothideomycetes. The relationship of this taxon to other taxa within the class is unknown (incertae sedis). This is a monotypic genus, containing the single species Punctillum hepaticarum.

See also 
 List of Dothideomycetes genera incertae sedis

References

External links 
 Punctillum at Index Fungorum

Dothideomycetes enigmatic taxa
Monotypic Dothideomycetes genera